Le Mêle-sur-Sarthe (literally Le Mêle on Sarthe) is a commune in the Orne department in north-western France.

Twin towns – sister cities

Le Mêle-sur-Sarthe is twinned with:

 Faringdon, United Kingdom (since 1990)
 Königstein im Taunus, Germany
 Libčany, Czech Republic

See also
Communes of the Orne department
Parc naturel régional Normandie-Maine

References

Melesursarthe